Stéphane Gachet (born January 18, 1974) is a French former ice hockey defenceman.

Gachet played junior hockey for the Beauport Harfangs of the Quebec Major Junior Hockey League before turning professional in his native France in 1994. He played for Ducs d'Angers, Lions de Lyon, Brûleurs de loups and Yétis du Mont-Blanc. Gachet also played for the France national team in the 1998 IIHF World Championship.

References

External links

1974 births
Living people
Beauport Harfangs players
Brûleurs de Loups players
Ducs d'Angers players
French ice hockey defencemen
LHC Les Lions players
Sportspeople from Albertville